L'adolescente (The Adolescent) is a 1976 commedia sexy all'italiana film directed by Alfonso Brescia. It starred Sonia Viviani, Daniela Giordano, Dagmar Lassander and Malisa Longo.

Plot
Vito Gnaula and Grazia Serritella are a Sicilian couple who marry after a series of turbulent events but Grazia is not willing to consummate their marriage, showing her father's sudden death as an excuse. Vito starts making sexual advances to his late father-in-law's secretary Katia but he has to avoid any scandal for he may lose the rights to his rich father-in-law's inheritance. However, the arrival of Grazia's teenage niece Serenella moves things well beyond Vito's control.

Cast
Tuccio Musumeci as Vito Gnaula
Daniela Giordano as Grazia Serritella
Sonia Viviani as Serenella, the niece
Raffaele Sparanero as Antonio
Dagmar Lassander as Katia Solvj
Aldo Giuffrè as Marshal of the Carabinieri
Giacomo Furia as the Notary
 as Lance Corporal Bragadin
Franca Scagnetti as Carmeluzza
Malisa Longo as Frau Marlene
Maria Bosco
Gaetano Balistreri
Aldo Cecconi
Adriano Corneli
Roberto Giraudo
Nello Pazzafini

Reception
Marco Giusti calls the film a "triumph of Sonia Viviani modelled after Gloria Guida, but in a Regnoli-Brescia version", and praises the female cast led by the graces of Dagmar Lassander and Daniela Giordano.

Bibliography

See also 
 List of Italian films of 1976

External links

L'adolescente at Variety Distribution
L’adolescente (di Alfonso Brescia)

1976 films
Commedia sexy all'italiana
1970s Italian-language films
1970s sex comedy films
Films set in Sicily
Films directed by Alfonso Brescia
Films scored by Alessandro Alessandroni
1976 comedy films
1970s Italian films